The 1992–93 National Football League, known for sponsorship reasons as the Royal Liver Assurance National Football League, was the 62nd staging of the National Football League (NFL), an annual Gaelic football tournament for the Gaelic Athletic Association county teams of Ireland.

Dublin defeated Donegal in the final after a replay, getting some revenge after losing the 1992 All-Ireland Final. Both finals were ill-tempered games, with two red cards in the first game and one in the second.

Format 

This was a one-off format for the National Football League. In order to re-format the league into four divisions, the 1992-93 league consisted of four "mixed ability" groups of eight teams each. The experimental format threw up some of the most unusual pairings in league history, and was credited with boosting attendances by as much as 60 per cent.

Divisions
There was one division comprising 32 teams, split into four groups of eight teams each.

Round-robin format
Each team played every other team in its division (or group where the division is split) once, either home or away.

Points awarded
2 points were awarded for a win and 1 for a draw.

Titles
Teams in all four groups competed for the National Football League title.

Knockout stage qualifiers
 Group A: top 2 teams
 Group B: top 2 teams
 Group C: top 2 teams
 Group D: top 2 teams

Promotion and relegation

Teams qualified for the four divisions of the 1993-94 National Football League based on their position in their group.

 Division One: teams placed first and second in each group
 Division Two: teams placed third and fourth in each group
 Division Three: teams placed fifth and sixth in each group
 Division Four:  teams placed seventh and eight in each group

League Tables

Group A

Group B

Group C

Group D

Knockout stages

Quarter-finals

Semi-finals

Finals

References

External links

National Football League
National Football League
National Football League (Ireland) seasons